This is a list of the first minority male lawyer(s) and judge(s) in Connecticut. It includes the year in which the men were admitted to practice law (in parentheses). Also included are other distinctions such as the first minority men in their state to graduate from law school or become a political figure

Firsts in state history

Lawyers 

First African American male: Edwin Archer Randolph (1880) 
 First African American male (federal prosecutor): Robert D. Glass (1951) in 1966 
 First Latino American male: Antonio Robaina (1972) 
 First Asian American male: Jackie Chan (1974)

State judges 

First African American male (judicial officer): Howard Drew 
First African American male (judge): Boce W. Barlow Jr. in 1957 
First African American male (now-defunct Connecticut Circuit Court): John Daly in 1961 
 First African American male (Connecticut Common Pleas Court): Robert L. Levister (1956) in 1974 
First African American male (Connecticut Superior Court): Robert L. Levister (1956) in 1976  
First African American male (Connecticut Court of Appeals): Flemming L. Norcott Jr. in 1987  
 First African American male (Connecticut Supreme Court): Robert D. Glass (1951) in 1987 
First African American male (administrative judge): Eugene Spear in 1989 
First African American male (chief judge): Eugene Spear in 1991
First Latino American male: Eddie Rodriguez in 1994
First Muslim and South Asian male (Pakistani descent): M. (Mohammad) Nawaz Wahla in 2010 
 First openly gay male (Connecticut Supreme Court): Andrew J. McDonald (1991) in 2013 
First African American male (Chief Justice; Connecticut Supreme Court): Richard A. Robinson in 2018

Federal judges 
First Puerto Rican male (U.S. District Court for the District of Connecticut): José A. Cabranes (1965) in 1979 
First (male) public defender of color (U.S. District Court for the District of Connecticut): Omar A. Williams:

Attorney General of Connecticut 

 First Asian American male: William Tong in 2018

Assistant Attorney General 

 First South Asian male: Rupal Shah Palanki in 2003

Public Defender 

 First African American male: Eugene Spear in 1978

Political Office 

 First openly African American LGBT male (Connecticut State Treasurer elect): Erick Russell in 2022

Firsts in local history 

 Robert L. Levister (1956): First African American male lawyer in Stamford, Connecticut [Fairfield County, Connecticut]
 Jackie Chan (1974): First Asian American male to serve as the President of the Danbury Bar Association, Connecticut
 Sung Ho Hwang: First Asian American male to serve as the President of the New Haven Bar Association (2012)
 Robert Glass (1949): First African American male lawyer in Waterbury, Connecticut [New Haven County, Connecticut]

See also 

 List of first minority male lawyers and judges in the United States

Other topics of interest 

 List of first women lawyers and judges in the United States
 List of first women lawyers and judges in Connecticut

References 

 
Minority, Connecticut, first
Minority, Connecticut, first
Connecticut lawyers
Lists of people from Connecticut
law